The 2013–2014 international cricket season was from September 2013 to March 2014.

Season overview

Rankings
The following are the current official rankings.

September

Namibia in the United Arab Emirates

Afghanistan vs Kenya in the United Arab Emirates

October

New Zealand women in the West Indies

New Zealand in Bangladesh

Australia in India

Pakistan vs South Africa in the United Arab Emirates

Sri Lanka women in South Africa

England women in the West Indies

November

West Indies in India

New Zealand in Sri Lanka

ICC World Twenty20 Qualifier

Group stage

Final standings

Pakistan in South Africa

England in Australia

December

West Indies in New Zealand

India in South Africa

Pakistan vs Afghanistan in the United Arab Emirates

2011–13 ICC Intercontinental Cup Final

Pakistan vs Sri Lanka in the United Arab Emirates

January

English women in Australia

Cricket World Cup Qualifier

Group stage

Playoffs

Super Sixes

Final Placings

Sri Lanka women in India

India in New Zealand

Sri Lanka in Bangladesh

February

Australia in South Africa

Ireland in the West Indies

West Indies women in New Zealand

Asia Cup

England in the West Indies

March

World Cricket League Division Five

Final Placings

Pakistan women in Bangladesh

India women in Bangladesh

ICC World Twenty20

First round

Super 10

Knockout stage

Final Placings

ICC Women's World Twenty20

References

External links
 2013/14 season on ESPN Cricinfo
 2013/14 Cricket Schedule

 
2013 in cricket
2014 in cricket